Guarania may refer to:

Guarania (music), a Paraguayan musical style
Guarania (plant), a genus of plants in the family Phyllanthaceae